Popadyino is a rural locality (a village) in Staroselskoye Rural Settlement, Vologodsky District, Vologda Oblast, Russia. The population was 48 as of 2002.

Geography 
Popadyino is located 71 km northwest of Vologda (the district's administrative centre) by road. Pogost Onochest is the nearest rural locality.

References 

Rural localities in Vologodsky District
Vologodsky Uyezd